The Manchester Titans is an American football team based in Manchester, England, that competes in the BAFA National Leagues Premier Division North, the highest level of British American Football. The team operate from the National Speedway Stadium in Gorton. The Titans were given British American Football League status in 2003, although they missed the following season in order to be restructured for the 2005 campaign. The team was founded in 2003 by two Ex-Manchester Allstars Youth team players who had been playing their football outside of the city.

The Titans are one of the biggest clubs in Great Britain with an extensive setup of teams at Adult Contact, Adult Flag, Women's Contact, Women's Flag, U19 Contact, U17 North and U17 South Contact, U17 Flag and U12 Flag and a partnership to run a team at The Manchester College, seeing The Titans were awarded the title of "British American Football Program of the Year" in both 2016 and 2017. Since the 2019 season the club has also operated a second team in the adult contact with the Manchester Titans Bees, who currently operate at BAFA Associate level.

History
American Football was first played in the Greater Manchester area in 1983 when the Northwich Spartans played the London Ravens. The following season the Spartans were renamed the Manchester Spartans. Other active clubs in the Manchester area at the time were the Allstars and Heroes. In the 1990s all of the Manchester sides folded and the city was without a Football team until 2003 when the Titans were born.

The formation of the club was inspired by the film "Remember the Titans", the club were founded by local players who until then had been travelling out of the City to play for other teams. The Titans were soon handed BAFA status and entered the year playing at Broughton Park F.C. Rugby Union Club, Manchester and finished with a 1-8-1 record before disbanding in 2004.

In 2005, the Adult Contact team re-entered the league after being restructured with new coaching staff and players. They finished the season winning 5 games and losing. In 2007, they moved grounds and began playing their fixtures at Broughton Park RUFC. During this season they also advanced to the play-offs after a 7-2-1 record where they defeated the Nottingham Caesars only to be knocked out by the Dundee Hurricanes in the semi-final.

In the 2009 season, The Titans won all 10 of their regular season games but were defeated in the first round play-off game against the Leicester Falcons. The following season saw the form continue and yet again they wiped the floor with the competition by winning all of their games on the route to the play-offs. This time they swiftly dispatched the West Coast Trojans and Shropshire Revolution to book their place in the National Final at the Britbowl. However, they were defeated 35-13 by the London Olympians.

The 2011 season was to be difficult as a large number of players departed which saw the team swap a 100% winning record for a 100% losing record, and due to controversial restructuring of the leagues the Titans were relegated in 2012. In October 2014, the club played its first game inside the Salford City Stadium, where they notched up a 64-0 win over the Crewe Railroaders in front of a crowd of 1,349.

A perfect 10-0 season in 2015 saw the Titans rise from Division 2 to Division 1 in the BAFA structure.  A first season in Division 1 in 2016 saw the Titans claim a 7-3 record and a play-off run that ended in the quarter finals.  In 2017 the team returned stronger, winning their division with a 9-1 record and advancing to the Division 1 national final where they beat the London Olympians 48-22 in the Britbowl Final to secure promotion to the Premier Division for 2018.

In the following season, the Titans emerged as the second-best team in the North, finishing 2018 with a 7-3 record. The Titans ultimately fell short in their first playoff game, losing heavily to the eventual National Champions, the London Warriors. In 2019, the Titans once again finished with a 7-3 record, despite becoming the first team to beat the Tamworth Phoenix in the regular season for four seasons, however ultimately fell one game short of a Premiership North title. Their playoff fate was also decided through another London Warriors team on their way to another National Championship. 

The 2020 season saw promise in Manchester with the addition of Jonathan Homer as the incoming Head Coach off the back of taking the Titans Under 19s team to a National Final. However, the season was ultimately suspended due to the Covid-19 Pandemic. 

When American Football returned in 2021, the British American Football Association had decided to regionalise divisions in lieu of a Premiership North. That Titans won BAFANL Red Rose Division through an undefeated 11-0 record. 

2022 saw the return of the Premiership North, where the Titans continued where they left off in 2021. Manchester scored 510 points through 10 games, achieving a mark of averaging 50 points scored per game in back-to-back years. The Titans defense held opponents to 8.1 points a game in response. Manchester were crowned Premiership North champions through a 9-1 record and received a home playoff berth through the playoffs. 

In the Semi-Final, the Titans welcomed the south's Bristol Aztecs to the National Speedway Stadium, where the winner would be the first team outside of London and Tamworth to go to a Britbowl in over 10 years. The Titans stormed to a 17-0 halftime lead, before fending off a Bristol comeback to win 32-27. 

The win saw the Titans matchup against the London Warriors, who last faced defeat in 2018. Manchester took an early 21-0 lead through a Thomas Jones rushing touchdown sandwiched between two by Adam Bamber. A Ben Martin touchdown, an Aaron Ainsworth-Bowcott field goal and a game-sealing interception returned for a touchdown by George Slade secured the Britbowl XXXIV title as Manchester boat-raced the London Warriors 37-7. Quarterback Sam Bloomfield received the Game MVP honours.

Youth Academy
The Titans Adult Flag team have been competing since 2013, offering non-contact American Football for men and women.  The team have enjoyed playoff runs in both 2016 and 2017 and in 2017 clinched the MEC North division title to cement a place in the Premier Division and bragging rights as the best team in Manchester. The Women's Flag team enter the national Opal series which is ran each autumn, playing teams from all over the country. The Titans best finish was a 6th place in 2014. They also operate Flag teams at U17 and U12 level. The Titans operate an U17 and U19 Youth contact team.

B Team

In 2018, The Titans announced they were adding a second team into the BAFA National Leagues setup, following a similar pattern to those set by the London Blitz and the Bristol Aztecs. Styled as the "Manchester Titans Bees" , the team began formation in the 2019 season and entered at BAFA Associate Level.

Women's team
The Titan's women's team have been at the forefront of the growth of the women's game.  Having played in the Sapphire series since 2014 they were one of the founding members of the women's premier division in 2015 making the Semi-Finals in both 2017 and 2018 to be ranked the 4th best team in Great Britain. Titans players Sian Perry, Louise Fitzsimmons, Emily Parkinson and Sian Kersse have all represented Great Britain at both the 2015 European Championships and the 2017 World Cup.

Stadium
The club have previously operated from a variety of stadiums in Manchester and can previously call the AJ Bell Stadium in Salford and  Belle Vue Stadium their former homes. In 2018 they moved to the brand new National Speedway Stadium in Gorton.

Notable Players and Coaches
The Club has had some talented and notable players over the years including Ricky Whittle and Chris Fountain (ex-Hollyoaks stars) and Owen Smith (known for no knees)

Several players have gone on to play Football overseas. The club also boasts an extensive and knowledgeable coaching staff, including current BAFA Coach of the Year and Assistant Offensive Coordinator, Luke Carlton.

Season records

References

External links
Manchester Titans Official Website

BAFA National League teams
American football teams in England
2003 establishments in England
Sport in Manchester
American football teams established in 2003